Wilhelm Adolf was a German luger who competed in the late 1920s. He won a gold medal in the men's doubles event at the 1928 European championships in Schreiberhau, Germany (now Szklarska Poręba, Poland).

References

German male lugers
Year of birth missing
Year of death missing
20th-century German people